In Ashkenazi Jewish tradition, a kolpik is a type of traditional headgear worn in families of some Chassidic rebbes (Hasidic rabbis) of Galician or Hungarian dynastic descent, by their unmarried children on the Sabbath (Shabbat), and by some rebbes on some special occasions other than Shabbat or major holidays. The kolpik is made from brown fur, as opposed to a spodik, worn by Polish chassidic dynasties, which is fashioned out of black fur. The shtreimel, another similar type of fur hat worn by Hasidim, are shorter in height, wider, and disc-shaped, while kolpiks are taller, thinner in bulk, and of cylindrical shape.

It is seen as an intermediate level garment between Shabbat and weekday dress.

The days that some rebbes don a kolpik include:
Rosh Chodesh Meal
Hanukah
Tu BiShvat Meal
Isru Chag Meal
Tu B'Av (most do not, but some do)
Meal served to the poor a few days before a child's wedding
Yartzeit Meal

It is often thought, that Jews adopted wearing fur hats from the Eastern Europeans, possibly from the nobility.
Joseph Margoshes (1866–1955) in his memoir A World Apart: A Memoir of Jewish Life in Nineteenth Century Galicia writes regarding Rabbi Shimon Sofer's election to the Imperial Council of Austria:

See also
 List of headgear
Shtreimel
 Spodik

References

Fur
Hasidic clothing
Hats
Religious headgear